Ronald Henry Tammen Jr. (born July 23, 1933) was a student at Miami University in Oxford, Ohio who went missing on April 19, 1953 and whose fate remains a mystery. Students of the university have since dubbed him the "Phantom of Oxford".

Biography
Tammen was from Maple Heights, Ohio, the second oldest of five children. In 1953, Tammen was a sophomore at Miami University living on-campus in Fisher Hall; his younger brother also attended the university. He was described as a tall handsome muscular athlete who was on the varsity wrestling team, and was a residence hall advisor. He played string bass in a band and drove a 1938 Chevrolet.

Disappearance
Tammen left his Fisher Hall room at approximately 8pm on the evening of Sunday, April 19, 1953, to get new bed sheets from the Hall manager because a prankster had put a fish in his bed. Tammen took the sheets and returned to his dorm room to study psychology, which was the last time he was definitely seen alive. At around 10:30pm on 19 April, Tammen's roommate returned to their room and found the lights on, the radio playing, Tammen's coat - notably it was a snowy night - his wallet, car keys, and a book open on the desk. Tammen had not returned by the next morning and authorities were notified, but Tammen was never found. The last person to see Tammen was the Hall manager earlier in the evening.

A woman from a nearby town said that someone matching Tammen's description had knocked on her door in the early morning of 20 April asking for directions to the bus stop. He appeared dazed and had a streak of dirt on his face. Other sightings over the years have been reported. When Fisher Hall was demolished in 1978 the ruins were searched but nothing was found.

Later investigations
Long considered a cold case, in 2009 detectives looked into old records about a John Doe body found in 1953 in Georgia, based on the theory that it might be the same person due to a height and weight match. They obtained DNA samples from Tammen's sister and the Georgia body, but there was no match. Nevertheless, it moved the case forward by entering Tammen's DNA into a database should any other search turn it up in the future.

An alumna of Miami University, Jennifer Wenger, has been researching the case since 2010. As of 2020, she is working on a book as well as maintaining a blog about Tammen.

See also 
List of people who disappeared

References

1933 births
1950s missing person cases
Miami University people
Missing person cases in Ohio